Frederick James O'Donnell (born December 6, 1949 in Kingston, Ontario and raised in Gananoque, Ontario) is a Canadian retired professional ice hockey player and coach. During his professional playing career, which lasted from 1970 to 1976, he played 115 games in the National Hockey League with the Boston Bruins and 155 games in the World Hockey Association with the New England Whalers, mainly at left wing. He later coached the Queen's University Golden Gaels hockey program for several seasons in the late 1970s and early 1980s, leading the team to the Ontario University Athletics title in 1981 (winning the Queen's Cup), and a berth in the national championship tournament that year in Calgary. He then coached the Kingston Canadians Major Junior hockey team for two seasons, from 1985-87. O'Donnell later worked in real estate in Kingston. He was inducted into the Kingston and District Sports Hall of Fame.

Career statistics

Regular season and playoffs

Coaching record

External links
 

1949 births
Living people
Boston Braves (AHL) players
Boston Bruins players
Canadian ice hockey coaches
Canadian ice hockey left wingers
Canadian people of Irish descent
Ice hockey people from Ontario
Kingston Canadians coaches
Minnesota North Stars draft picks
New England Whalers players
Oklahoma City Blazers (1965–1977) players
Oshawa Generals players
People from Leeds and Grenville United Counties
Sportspeople from Kingston, Ontario